

Offseason
 November 19, 1956: Del Ennis was traded by the Phillies to the St. Louis Cardinals for Rip Repulski and Bobby Morgan.

Regular season 
The Phillies integrated during the 1957 season. John Kennedy, the team's first black player, made his debut with the Phillies on April 22, 1957, at Roosevelt Stadium against the Brooklyn Dodgers.

Season standings

Record vs. opponents

Notable transactions 
 April 5, 1957: Tim Harkness, Ron Negray, Elmer Valo, Mel Geho (minors), and $75,000 were traded by the Phillies to the Brooklyn Dodgers for Chico Fernández. The Phillies completed the deal by sending Ben Flowers to the Dodgers on April 8.
 June 17, 1957: Frank Baumholtz was released by the Phillies.
 June 26, 1957: Warren Hacker was selected off waivers by the Phillies from the Cincinnati Redlegs.

Game log

|- style="background:#fbb"
| 1 || April 16 || Dodgers || 6–7 (12) || Clem Labine (1–0) || Robin Roberts (0–1) || None || 37,667 || 0–1
|- style="background:#fbb"
| 2 || April 18 || @ Giants || 2–6 || Rubén Gómez (1–0) || Curt Simmons (0–1) || None || 8,585 || 0–2
|- style="background:#bfb"
| 3 || April 20 || @ Giants || 6–5 || Harvey Haddix (1–0) || Al Worthington (0–1) || Bob Miller (1) || 8,875 || 1–2
|- style="background:#fbb"
| 4 || April 21 (1) || @ Giants || 1–2 || Johnny Antonelli (1–1) || Robin Roberts (0–2) || None || see 2nd game || 1–3
|- style="background:#bfb"
| 5 || April 21 (2) || @ Giants || 8–5 || Jack Sanford (1–0) || Curt Barclay (0–1) || Don Cardwell (1) || 14,230 || 2–3
|- style="background:#fbb"
| 6 || April 22 || @ Dodgers || 1–5 || Roger Craig (1–0) || Jim Hearn (0–1) || Clem Labine (2) || 11,629 || 2–4
|- style="background:#bfb"
| 7 || April 24 || Pirates || 8–5 || Curt Simmons (1–1) || Bob Friend (1–2) || Bob Miller (2) || 15,849 || 3–4
|- style="background:#bfb"
| 8 || April 26 || Giants || 5–0 || Don Cardwell (1–0) || Johnny Antonelli (1–2) || None || 14,118 || 4–4
|- style="background:#fbb"
| 9 || April 27 || Giants || 2–10 || Rubén Gómez (3–0) || Robin Roberts (0–3) || None || 7,577 || 4–5
|- style="background:#bfb"
| 10 || April 28 (1) || Giants || 11–2 || Jack Sanford (2–0) || Al Worthington (0–2) || Bob Miller (3) || see 2nd game || 5–5
|- style="background:#fbb"
| 11 || April 28 (2) || Giants || 7–8 || Curt Barclay (1–2) || Jack Meyer (0–1) || Marv Grissom (1) || 19,482 || 5–6
|- style="background:#fbb"
| 12 || April 30 || Redlegs || 3–6 || Brooks Lawrence (2–1) || Harvey Haddix (1–1) || None || 14,851 || 5–7
|-

|- style="background:#fbb"
| 13 || May 1 || Redlegs || 6–8 (16) || Warren Hacker (1–1) || Turk Farrell (0–1) || Hersh Freeman (1) || 8,606 || 5–8
|- style="background:#bfb"
| 14 || May 2 || Cubs || 4–2 || Robin Roberts (1–3) || Dick Drott (0–3) || None || 4,591 || 6–8
|- style="background:#bfb"
| 15 || May 3 || Cubs || 9–6 || Turk Farrell (1–1) || Jackie Collum (1–1) || Jim Hearn (1) || 6,160 || 7–8
|- style="background:#bfb"
| 16 || May 4 || Cubs || 5–2 || Jack Sanford (3–0) || Jim Brosnan (0–1) || None || 3,283 || 8–8
|- style="background:#fbb"
| 17 || May 5 (1) || Cardinals || 4–8 || Lloyd Merritt (1–0) || Bob Miller (0–1) || None || see 2nd game || 8–9
|- style="background:#fbb"
| 18 || May 5 (2) || Cardinals || 0–2 || Sam Jones (2–0) || Harvey Haddix (1–2) || None || 27,213 || 8–10
|- style="background:#bfb"
| 19 || May 7 || Braves || 8–4 || Robin Roberts (2–3) || Warren Spahn (4–1) || None || 20,421 || 9–10
|- style="background:#bfb"
| 20 || May 8 || Braves || 2–1 || Don Cardwell (2–0) || Gene Conley (0–1) || None || 17,739 || 10–10
|- style="background:#bfb"
| 21 || May 10 || @ Pirates || 3–1 || Jack Sanford (4–0) || Ron Kline (0–4) || None || 10,027 || 11–10
|- style="background:#bfb"
| 22 || May 11 || @ Pirates || 7–2 || Harvey Haddix (2–2) || Bob Friend (2–3) || None || 4,994 || 12–10
|- style="background:#bfb"
| 23 || May 12 (1) || @ Pirates || 6–2 || Curt Simmons (2–1) || Luis Arroyo (0–4) || Bob Miller (4) || see 2nd game || 13–10
|- style="background:#fbb"
| 24 || May 12 (2) || @ Pirates || 1–6 || Vern Law (2–1) || Robin Roberts (2–4) || None || 10,457 || 13–11
|- style="background:#bfb"
| 25 || May 14 || @ Redlegs || 10–8 || Turk Farrell (2–1) || Raúl Sánchez (2–1) || Robin Roberts (1) || 9,829 || 14–11
|- style="background:#fbb"
| 26 || May 15 || @ Redlegs || 2–7 || Brooks Lawrence (4–1) || Jack Sanford (4–1) || None || 12,442 || 14–12
|- style="background:#fbb"
| 27 || May 16 || @ Cardinals || 0–5 || Lindy McDaniel (2–1) || Harvey Haddix (2–3) || None || 5,377 || 14–13
|- style="background:#bfb"
| 28 || May 17 || @ Cardinals || 5–3 || Robin Roberts (3–4) || Sam Jones (2–2) || None || 9,367 || 15–13
|- style="background:#bfb"
| 29 || May 18 || @ Cardinals || 7–5 || Curt Simmons (3–1) || Lloyd Merritt (1–1) || None || 5,232 || 16–13
|- style="background:#bbb"
| – || May 19 (1) || @ Cubs || colspan=6 | Postponed (rain); Makeup: September 17
|- style="background:#bbb"
| – || May 19 (2) || @ Cubs || colspan=6 | Postponed (rain); Makeup: September 18
|- style="background:#fffdd0"
| 30 || May 21 || @ Braves || 1–1 (5) || None || None || None || 15,936 || 16–13–1
|- style="background:#fbb"
| 31 || May 22 || @ Braves || 3–4 (13) || Juan Pizarro (2–2) || Robin Roberts (3–5) || None || 21,775 || 16–14–1
|- style="background:#bfb"
| 32 || May 24 || Pirates || 7–3 || Jack Sanford (5–1) || Bob Friend (3–4) || Turk Farrell (1) || 17,340 || 17–14–1
|- style="background:#bfb"
| 33 || May 25 || Pirates || 8–6 || Harvey Haddix (3–3) || Ron Kline (0–6) || Turk Farrell (2) || 6,445 || 18–14–1
|- style="background:#fbb"
| 34 || May 26 (1) || Pirates || 5–13 || Roy Face (1–3) || Curt Simmons (3–2) || None || see 2nd game || 18–15–1
|- style="background:#bfb"
| 35 || May 26 (2) || Pirates || 6–3 || Don Cardwell (3–0) || Luis Arroyo (1–5) || None || 13,557 || 19–15–1
|- style="background:#fbb"
| 36 || May 27 || Dodgers || 1–5 || Don Drysdale (4–1) || Robin Roberts (3–6) || None || 20,673 || 19–16–1
|- style="background:#bfb"
| 37 || May 28 || @ Giants || 16–6 || Bob Miller (1–1) || Johnny Antonelli (3–6) || None || 4,977 || 20–16–1
|- style="background:#bfb"
| 38 || May 29 || @ Giants || 7–5 (10) || Robin Roberts (4–6) || Marv Grissom (0–2) || None || 2,216 || 21–16–1
|- style="background:#bfb"
| 39 || May 30 (1) || @ Giants || 2–1 (10) || Curt Simmons (4–2) || Rubén Gómez (6–3) || None || see 2nd game || 22–16–1
|- style="background:#fbb"
| 40 || May 30 (2) || @ Giants || 1–8 || Curt Barclay (3–3) || Don Cardwell (3–1) || None || 19,887 || 22–17–1
|- style="background:#bfb"
| 41 || May 31 || Dodgers || 2–1 || Robin Roberts (5–6) || Don Drysdale (4–2) || None || 24,381 || 23–17–1
|-

|- style="background:#bfb"
| 42 || June 1 || Dodgers || 3–0 || Jack Sanford (6–1) || Roger Craig (1–2) || None || 30,621 || 24–17–1
|- style="background:#bfb"
| 43 || June 2 || Dodgers || 5–3 || Turk Farrell (3–1) || Don Newcombe (4–5) || None || 20,259 || 25–17–1
|- style="background:#fbb"
| 44 || June 3 || Dodgers || 0–4 || Johnny Podres (5–2) || Don Cardwell (3–2) || None || 18,218 || 25–18–1
|- style="background:#bfb"
| 45 || June 4 || Redlegs || 3–1 || Harvey Haddix (4–3) || Brooks Lawrence (4–3) || None || 20,759 || 26–18–1
|- style="background:#fbb"
| 46 || June 5 || Redlegs || 2–4 (11) || Johnny Klippstein (2–4) || Turk Farrell (3–2) || None || 15,771 || 26–19–1
|- style="background:#bfb"
| 47 || June 6 || Redlegs || 6–2 || Robin Roberts (6–6) || Don Gross (4–2) || None || 27,307 || 27–19–1
|- style="background:#bfb"
| 48 || June 7 || Cubs || 1–0 || Jack Sanford (7–1) || Dave Hillman (0–2) || None || 12,845 || 28–19–1
|- style="background:#bbb"
| – || June 8 || Cubs || colspan=6 | Postponed (rain); Makeup: July 11 as a traditional double-header
|- style="background:#fbb"
| 49 || June 9 (1) || Cubs || 3–7 || Dick Drott (4–6) || Robin Roberts (6–7) || Turk Lown (3) || see 2nd game || 28–20–1
|- style="background:#fffdd0"
| 50 || June 9 (2) || Cubs || 4–4 || None || None || None || 17,375 || 28–20–2
|- style="background:#fbb"
| 51 || June 11 || Cardinals || 2–5 || Murry Dickson (3–2) || Curt Simmons (4–3) || None || 23,888 || 28–21–2
|- style="background:#fbb"
| 52 || June 12 || Cardinals || 0–4 || Larry Jackson (8–2) || Robin Roberts (6–8) || None || 22,749 || 28–22–2
|- style="background:#bfb"
| 53 || June 13 || Cardinals || 8–1 || Jack Sanford (8–1) || Vinegar Bend Mizell (1–4) || None || 22,509 || 29–22–2
|- style="background:#fbb"
| 54 || June 14 || Braves || 2–10 || Warren Spahn (7–3) || Don Cardwell (3–3) || None || 29,465 || 29–23–2
|- style="background:#fbb"
| 55 || June 15 || Braves || 2–7 || Bob Buhl (6–2) || Harvey Haddix (4–4) || None || 12,178 || 29–24–2
|- style="background:#fbb"
| 56 || June 16 (1) || Braves || 2–3 || Juan Pizarro (3–5) || Bob Miller (1–2) || None || see 2nd game || 29–25–2
|- style="background:#bfb"
| 57 || June 16 (2) || Braves || 1–0 || Curt Simmons (5–3) || Lew Burdette (5–3) || None || 30,520 || 30–25–2
|- style="background:#bfb"
| 58 || June 18 || @ Cubs || 7–6 || Jim Hearn (1–1) || Dave Hillman (0–4) || None || 6,092 || 31–25–2
|- style="background:#fbb"
| 59 || June 19 (1) || @ Cubs || 0–9 || Dick Drott (6–6) || Don Cardwell (3–4) || None || see 2nd game || 31–26–2
|- style="background:#fbb"
| 60 || June 19 (2) || @ Cubs || 3–4 || Moe Drabowsky (4–5) || Bob Miller (1–3) || Turk Lown (5) || 10,939 || 31–27–2
|- style="background:#bfb"
| 61 || June 20 || @ Cubs || 7–2 || Harvey Haddix (5–4) || Don Kaiser (2–5) || None || 5,210 || 32–27–2
|- style="background:#bfb"
| 62 || June 21 || @ Braves || 6–1 || Curt Simmons (6–3) || Lew Burdette (5–4) || None || 33,533 || 33–27–2
|- style="background:#bfb"
| 63 || June 22 || @ Braves || 4–2 || Jack Sanford (9–1) || Bob Trowbridge (2–1) || None || 25,498 || 34–27–2
|- style="background:#fbb"
| 64 || June 23 (1) || @ Braves || 6–7 || Bob Buhl (8–2) || Robin Roberts (6–9) || None || see 2nd game || 34–28–2
|- style="background:#fbb"
| 65 || June 23 (2) || @ Braves || 3–7 || Taylor Phillips (3–2) || Seth Morehead (0–1) || Bob Trowbridge (1) || 36,037 || 34–29–2
|- style="background:#bfb"
| 66 || June 24 || @ Braves || 10–4 || Harvey Haddix (6–4) || Warren Spahn (7–5) || Jim Hearn (2) || 15,600 || 35–29–2
|- style="background:#bfb"
| 67 || June 26 || @ Cardinals || 11–3 || Curt Simmons (7–3) || Lindy McDaniel (7–4) || None || 14,192 || 36–29–2
|- style="background:#fbb"
| 68 || June 27 || @ Cardinals || 4–6 || Von McDaniel (3–0) || Jack Sanford (9–2) || Hoyt Wilhelm (7) || 25,133 || 36–30–2
|- style="background:#fbb"
| 69 || June 28 || @ Redlegs || 1–7 || Hal Jeffcoat (7–5) || Don Cardwell (3–5) || None || 16,848 || 36–31–2
|- style="background:#fbb"
| 70 || June 29 || @ Redlegs || 3–8 || Tom Acker (9–3) || Robin Roberts (6–10) || None || 10,290 || 36–32–2
|- style="background:#fbb"
| 71 || June 30 (1) || @ Redlegs || 1–6 || Brooks Lawrence (9–4) || Curt Simmons (7–4) || None || see 2nd game || 36–33–2
|- style="background:#fbb"
| 72 || June 30 (2) || @ Redlegs || 2–6 || Johnny Klippstein (3–7) || Harvey Haddix (6–5) || Brooks Lawrence (1) || 32,584 || 36–34–2
|-

|- style="background:#bfb"
| 73 || July 1 || @ Pirates || 5–4 || Jim Hearn (2–1) || Bob Smith (0–2) || Seth Morehead (1) || 14,680 || 37–34–2
|- style="background:#bfb"
| 74 || July 4 (1) || Giants || 2–1 || Harvey Haddix (7–5) || Rubén Gómez (10–6) || None || see 2nd game || 38–34–2
|- style="background:#bfb"
| 75 || July 4 (2) || Giants || 6–2 || Curt Simmons (8–4) || Stu Miller (3–4) || Turk Farrell (3) ||| 30,442 || 39–34–2
|- style="background:#fbb"
| 76 || July 5 || @ Dodgers || 5–6 || Roger Craig (3–5) || Robin Roberts (6–11) || Johnny Podres (1) || 13,324 || 39–35–2
|- style="background:#bfb"
| 77 || July 6 || @ Dodgers || 9–4 || Jack Sanford (10–2) || Don Drysdale (6–6) || None || 8,939 || 40–35–2
|- style="background:#bfb"
| 78 || July 7 (1) || @ Dodgers || 2–1 || Warren Hacker (4–2) || Sal Maglie (3–2) || Turk Farrell (4) || see 2nd game || 41–35–2
|- style="background:#bfb"
| 79 || July 7 (2) || @ Dodgers || 5–3 || Jim Hearn (3–1) || Clem Labine (3–5) || Turk Farrell (5) || 16,805 || 42–35–2
|- style="background:#bbcaff;"
| – || July 9 ||colspan="7" |1957 Major League Baseball All-Star Game at Sportsman's Park in St. Louis
|- style="background:#bfb"
| 80 || July 11 (1) || Cubs || 1–0 (11) || Harvey Haddix (8–5) || Bob Rush (1–8) || None || see 2nd game || 43–35–2
|- style="background:#bfb"
| 81 || July 11 (2) || Cubs || 3–1 || Jack Sanford (11–2) || Don Elston (2–1) || None || 25,897 || 44–35–2
|- style="background:#fbb"
| 82 || July 12 || Cubs || 2–5 || Jim Brosnan (1–3) || Robin Roberts (6–12) || None || 11,526 || 44–36–2
|- style="background:#bfb"
| 83 || July 13 || Cubs || 5–2 || Warren Hacker (5–2) || Dick Drott (8–8) || Turk Farrell (6) || 4,541 || 45–36–2
|- style="background:#bfb"
| 84 || July 14 (1) || Cardinals || 6–2 || Curt Simmons (9–4) || Von McDaniel (4–1) || None || see 2nd game || 46–36–2
|- style="background:#bfb"
| 85 || July 14 (2) || Cardinals || 11–4 || Jim Hearn (4–1) || Larry Jackson (10–5) || None || 26,451 || 47–36–2
|- style="background:#bfb"
| 86 || July 15 || Cardinals || 6–2 || Jack Sanford (12–2) || Vinegar Bend Mizell (3–7) || None || 33,906 || 48–36–2
|- style="background:#fbb"
| 87 || July 16 || Braves || 2–6 || Warren Spahn (10–7) || Harvey Haddix (8–6) || None || 24,846 || 48–37–2
|- style="background:#fbb"
| 88 || July 17 || Braves || 3–10 || Lew Burdette (8–6) || Jack Meyer (0–2) || Don McMahon (3) || 24,596 || 48–38–2
|- style="background:#fbb"
| 89 || July 18 || Braves || 2–4 || Bob Buhl (10–6) || Curt Simmons (9–5) || Don McMahon (4) || 24,385 || 48–39–2
|- style="background:#fbb"
| 90 || July 19 || Redlegs || 2–7 || Joe Nuxhall (4–5) || Jack Sanford (12–3) || None || 27,147 || 48–40–2
|- style="background:#bfb"
| 91 || July 20 || Redlegs || 7–5 || Turk Farrell (4–2) || Don Gross (4–6) || None || 11,574 || 49–40–2
|- style="background:#fbb"
| 92 || July 21 (1) || Redlegs || 2–4 || Brooks Lawrence (11–5) || Robin Roberts (6–13) || Hersh Freeman (7) || see 2nd game || 49–41–2
|- style="background:#fbb"
| 93 || July 21 (2) || Redlegs || 4–6 || Art Fowler (1–0) || Harvey Haddix (8–7) || Johnny Klippstein (1) || 26,787 || 49–42–2
|- style="background:#fbb"
| 94 || July 23 || @ Braves || 0–1 || Bob Buhl (11–6) || Curt Simmons (9–6) || None || 34,243 || 49–43–2
|- style="background:#bfb"
| 95 || July 24 || @ Braves || 3–1 || Jack Sanford (13–3) || Gene Conley (3–5) || None || 32,412 || 50–43–2
|- style="background:#bfb"
| 96 || July 25 || @ Braves || 5–3 || Robin Roberts (7–13) || Warren Spahn (10–8) || Turk Farrell (7) || 28,545 || 51–43–2
|- style="background:#bfb"
| 97 || July 26 || @ Cubs || 3–1 (10) || Warren Hacker (6–2) || Bob Rush (1–11) || Turk Farrell (8) || 8,957 || 52–43–2
|- style="background:#fbb"
| 98 || July 27 || @ Cubs || 1–6 || Jim Brosnan (2–4) || Harvey Haddix (8–8) || None || 11,323 || 52–44–2
|- style="background:#bfb"
| 99 || July 28 (1) || @ Cubs || 3–2 || Curt Simmons (10–6) || Tom Poholsky (1–6) || Turk Farrell (9) || see 2nd game || 53–44–2
|- style="background:#bfb"
| 100 || July 28 (2) || @ Cubs || 7–1 || Jack Sanford (14–3) || Dick Drott (9–9) || None || 20,512 || 54–44–2
|- style="background:#bfb"
| 101 || July 29 || @ Cubs || 6–0 || Robin Roberts (8–13) || Don Elston (3–4) || None || 3,637 || 55–44–2
|- style="background:#bfb"
| 102 || July 30 || @ Redlegs || 8–5 || Bob Miller (2–3) || Hersh Freeman (5–2) || None || 15,813 || 56–44–2
|- style="background:#fbb"
| 103 || July 31 || @ Redlegs || 5–6 (11) || Art Fowler (3–0) || Bob Miller (2–4) || None || 12,721 || 56–45–2
|-

|- style="background:#fbb"
| 104 || August 1 || @ Redlegs || 3–4 || Johnny Klippstein (5–10) || Curt Simmons (10–7) || Tom Acker (4) || 11,720 || 56–46–2
|- style="background:#fbb"
| 105 || August 2 || @ Cardinals || 4–5 (10) || Willard Schmidt (10–1) || Bob Miller (2–5) || None || 21,898 || 56–47–2
|- style="background:#fbb"
| 106 || August 3 || @ Cardinals || 1–3 || Von McDaniel (6–2) || Robin Roberts (8–14) || Billy Muffett (1) || 18,955 || 56–48–2
|- style="background:#bfb"
| 107 || August 4 (1) || @ Cardinals || 5–4 (12) || Harvey Haddix (9–8) || Larry Jackson (12–6) || None || see 2nd game || 57–48–2
|- style="background:#fbb"
| 108 || August 4 (2) || @ Cardinals || 1–4 || Lindy McDaniel (10–6) || Warren Hacker (6–3) || None || 29,098 || 57–49–2
|- style="background:#fbb"
| 109 || August 6 || @ Pirates || 3–5 || Ron Kline (3–15) || Jack Sanford (14–4) || None || 11,136 || 57–50–2
|- style="background:#bfb"
| 110 || August 8 || @ Pirates || 6–3 || Curt Simmons (11–7) || Vern Law (7–7) || Bob Miller (5) || 5,238 || 58–50–2
|- style="background:#fbb"
| 111 || August 9 || @ Giants || 2–6 || Ray Crone (5–6) || Robin Roberts (8–15) || None || 6,247 || 58–51–2
|- style="background:#bbb"
| – || August 10 || @ Giants || colspan=6 | Postponed (rain); Makeup: August 11 as a traditional double-header
|- style="background:#fbb"
| 112 || August 11 (1) || @ Giants || 0–5 || Curt Barclay (7–7) || Harvey Haddix (9–9) || None || see 2nd game || 58–52–2
|- style="background:#bfb"
| 113 || August 11 (2) || @ Giants || 2–0 || Jack Sanford (15–4) || Johnny Antonelli (11–12) || None || 13,880 || 59–52–2
|- style="background:#fbb"
| 114 || August 13 || Pirates || 0–6 || Bob Friend (8–15) || Warren Hacker (6–4) || None || 14,129 || 59–53–2
|- style="background:#fbb"
| 115 || August 14 || Pirates || 3–10 || Vern Law (9–7) || Curt Simmons (11–8) || None || 8,641 || 59–54–2
|- style="background:#fbb"
| 116 || August 16 || Giants || 1–2 || Stu Miller (5–8) || Robin Roberts (8–16) || None || 16,733 || 59–55–2
|- style="background:#bfb"
| 117 || August 17 || Giants || 3–1 || Jack Sanford (16–4) || Rubén Gómez (13–10) || None || 7,929 || 60–55–2
|- style="background:#fbb"
| 118 || August 18 (1) || Giants || 4–5 || Mike McCormick (2–0) || Warren Hacker (6–5) || Marv Grissom (8) || see 2nd game || 60–56–2
|- style="background:#fbb"
| 119 || August 18 (2) || Giants || 0–1 || Al Worthington (8–8) || Harvey Haddix (9–10) || None || 14,591 || 60–57–2
|- style="background:#bfb"
| 120 || August 20 (1) || Cubs || 2–1 (10) || Turk Farrell (5–2) || Moe Drabowsky (9–11) || None || see 2nd game || 61–57–2
|- style="background:#fbb"
| 121 || August 20 (2) || Cubs || 2–5 || Don Elston (4–5) || Robin Roberts (8–17) || None || 15,129 || 61–58–2
|- style="background:#fbb"
| 122 || August 22 || Cardinals || 5–6 || Larry Jackson (13–6) || Jack Sanford (16–5) || Billy Muffett (3) || 21,947 || 61–59–2
|- style="background:#bfb"
| 123 || August 23 || Cardinals || 3–2 || Harvey Haddix (10–10) || Vinegar Bend Mizell (5–10) || None || 20,284 || 62–59–2
|- style="background:#fbb"
| 124 || August 24 || Cardinals || 2–5 || Herm Wehmeier (6–6) || Curt Simmons (11–9) || None || 11,049 || 62–60–2
|- style="background:#fbb"
| 125 || August 25 || Braves || 3–7 || Warren Spahn (16–8) || Robin Roberts (8–18) || None || 14,051 || 62–61–2
|- style="background:#bfb"
| 126 || August 26 || Braves || 4–3 || Turk Farrell (6–2) || Ernie Johnson (6–2) || None || 21,397 || 63–61–2
|- style="background:#fbb"
| 127 || August 27 || Redlegs || 2–5 || Joe Nuxhall (8–7) || Don Cardwell (3–6) || None || 15,520 || 63–62–2
|- style="background:#fbb"
| 128 || August 28 || Redlegs || 5–6 || Brooks Lawrence (12–11) || Curt Simmons (11–10) || Johnny Klippstein (2) || 15,134 || 63–63–2
|- style="background:#bfb"
| 129 || August 30 || Pirates || 4–3 || Jack Sanford (17–5) || Vern Law (10–8) || None || 8,157 || 64–63–2
|- style="background:#bfb"
| 130 || August 31 || Pirates || 7–1 || Don Cardwell (4–6) || Bob Friend (10–17) || None || 5,141 || 65–63–2
|-

|- style="background:#bfb"
| 131 || September 1 (1) || Pirates || 11–3 || Robin Roberts (9–18) || Bob Purkey (10–13) || None || see 2nd game || 66–63–2
|- style="background:#fbb"
| 132 || September 1 (2) || Pirates || 3–6 || Whammy Douglas (2–2) || Curt Simmons (11–11) || Roy Face (7) || 11,294 || 66–64–2
|- style="background:#bfb"
| 133 || September 2 (1) || @ Dodgers || 10–4 || Warren Hacker (7–5) || Danny McDevitt (6–2) || None || see 2nd game || 67–64–2
|- style="background:#bfb"
| 134 || September 2 (2) || @ Dodgers || 7–4 || Jim Hearn (5–1) || Roger Craig (5–8) || None || 18,895 || 68–64–2
|- style="background:#bfb"
| 135 || September 3 || @ Dodgers || 3–2 (12) || Turk Farrell (7–2) || Don Drysdale (14–8) || Bob Miller (6) || 10,190 || 69–64–2
|- style="background:#fbb"
| 136 || September 4 || Dodgers || 3–12 || Don Newcombe (11–11) || Don Cardwell (4–7) || Ed Roebuck (6) || 17,615 || 69–65–2
|- style="background:#fbb"
| 137 || September 5 || Dodgers || 1–3 || Carl Erskine (4–2) || Robin Roberts (9–19) || Ed Roebuck (7) || 18,087 || 69–66–2
|- style="background:#fbb"
| 138 || September 6 || @ Pirates || 2–3 || Ron Kline (7–15) || Harvey Haddix (10–11) || None || 6,915 || 69–67–2
|- style="background:#fbb"
| 139 || September 7 || @ Pirates || 3–6 || Red Swanson (3–2) || Jack Sanford (17–6) || Roy Face (9) || 4,612 || 69–68–2
|- style="background:#bfb"
| 140 || September 8 (1) || @ Pirates || 7–4 || Turk Farrell (8–2) || Bob Purkey (10–14) || Robin Roberts (2) || see 2nd game || 70–68–2
|- style="background:#fbb"
| 141 || September 8 (2) || @ Pirates || 2–6 || Bob Smith (1–3) || Warren Hacker (7–6) || None || 12,021 || 70–69–2
|- style="background:#fbb"
| 142 || September 10 || @ Cardinals || 3–4 (14) || Lindy McDaniel (14–8) || Robin Roberts (9–20) || None || 10,997 || 70–70–2
|- style="background:#fbb"
| 143 || September 11 || @ Cardinals || 6–14 || Herm Wehmeier (9–6) || Harvey Haddix (10–12) || Hoyt Wilhelm (11) || 10,674 || 70–71–2
|- style="background:#fbb"
| 144 || September 13 || @ Redlegs || 7–8 || Tom Acker (10–5) || Jack Sanford (17–7) || Johnny Klippstein (3) || 6,805 || 70–72–2
|- style="background:#bfb"
| 145 || September 14 || @ Redlegs || 5–0 || Robin Roberts (10–20) || Brooks Lawrence (15–12) || None || 4,527 || 71–72–2
|- style="background:#bfb"
| 146 || September 15 || @ Braves || 3–2 (10) || Turk Farrell (9–2) || Warren Spahn (19–10) || None || 34,920 || 72–72–2
|- style="background:#fbb"
| 147 || September 16 || @ Braves || 1–5 || Bob Buhl (17–6) || Harvey Haddix (10–13) || None || 20,929 || 72–73–2
|- style="background:#fbb"
| 148 || September 17 || @ Cubs || 1–7 || Moe Drabowsky (11–14) || Jack Sanford (17–8) || None || 1,727 || 72–74–2
|- style="background:#fbb"
| 149 || September 18 || @ Cubs || 4–6 || Dick Drott (15–11) || Robin Roberts (10–21) || Don Elston (6) || 2,094 || 72–75–2
|- style="background:#bfb"
| 150 || September 20 || @ Dodgers || 3–2 || Turk Farrell (10–2) || Carl Erskine (5–3) || Jim Hearn (3) || 6,749 || 73–75–2
|- style="background:#bfb"
| 151 || September 21 || @ Dodgers || 3–2 || Jack Sanford (18–8) || Johnny Podres (12–9) || Turk Farrell (10) || 5,118 || 74–75–2
|- style="background:#fbb"
| 152 || September 22 || @ Dodgers || 3–7 || Don Drysdale (17–9) || Robin Roberts (10–22) || None || 6,662 || 74–76–2
|- style="background:#bfb"
| 153 || September 24 || Giants || 5–0 || Curt Simmons (12–11) || Curt Barclay (9–9) || None || 7,019 || 75–76–2
|- style="background:#bfb"
| 154 || September 27 || Dodgers || 3–2 || Jack Sanford (19–8) || Bill Harris (0–1) || None || 11,595 || 76–76–2
|- style="background:#fbb"
| 155 || September 28 || Dodgers || 4–8 || Ed Roebuck (8–2) || Don Cardwell (4–8) || Johnny Podres (3) || 5,797 || 76–77–2
|- style="background:#bfb"
| 156 || September 29 || Dodgers || 2–1 || Seth Morehead (1–1) || Roger Craig (6–9) || None || 9,886 || 77–77–2
|-

| style="text-align:left;" |
The second game on April 28 was suspended (Sunday curfew) in the bottom of the seventh inning with the score 7–8 and was completed August 16, 1957.
The May 21 game was called after 5 innings (reduced to 5 innings) with the score tied 1–1. It was replayed from the start on June 24, 1957.
The second game on June 9 was suspended (Sunday curfew) in the top of the tenth inning with the score 4–4. Because at least nine innings had been completed, the game was replayed from the beginning on August 20, 1957.
The July 17 game was protested by the Phillies between the first and second innings. The protest was later denied.

Roster

Player stats

Batting

Starters by position 
Note: Pos = Position; G = Games played; AB = At bats; H = Hits; Avg. = Batting average; HR = Home runs; RBI = Runs batted in

Other batters 
Note: G = Games played; AB = At bats; H = Hits; Avg. = Batting average; HR = Home runs; RBI = Runs batted in

Pitching

Starting pitchers 
Note: G = Games pitched; IP = Innings pitched; W = Wins; L = Losses; ERA = Earned run average; SO = Strikeouts

Other pitchers 
Note: G = Games pitched; IP = Innings pitched; W = Wins; L = Losses; ERA = Earned run average; SO = Strikeouts

Relief pitchers 
Note: G = Games pitched; W = Wins; L = Losses; SV = Saves; ERA = Earned run average; SO = Strikeouts

Farm system 

LEAGUE CHAMPIONS: TampaMoultrie franchise transferred to Brunswick, June 1, 1957

Notes

References 
1957 Philadelphia Phillies season at Baseball Reference

Philadelphia Phillies seasons
Philadelphia Phillies season
Philadelphia